Joseph Kollins Reyes (born March 28, 1985), known professionally as Thou Reyes, is a Filipino actor and model.

Filmography

Television

Film

Theatre

Awards and nominations

References

External links 

 

1985 births
Living people
Filipino male child actors
People from Quezon City
ABS-CBN personalities
Star Magic
GMA Network personalities
Male actors from Metro Manila
Filipino television personalities
Filipino people of African-American descent
20th-century Filipino male actors
21st-century Filipino male actors
Filipino male television actors